Ben Stirling (born 16 August 1998) is a Scottish professional footballer who plays as a defender.

Club career
Stirling began his career with Hibernian, moving on loan to Berwick Rangers in July 2016. He moved on loan to Cowdenbeath in August 2017, but the loan was cut short in January 2018 after he was recalled by Hibernian manager Neil Lennon. He spent further loans spells at Arbroath in September 2019, and Alloa Athletic in January 2020.

He moved to Hamilton Academical in September 2020. On 14 January 2022, Stirling joined Scottish League Two side Edinburgh City on loan for the remainder of the 2021–22 season.

He was released by Hamilton at the end of his contract in May 2022.

International career
Stirling made three appearances for Scotland at under-16 level in 2013.

References

1998 births
Living people
Scottish footballers
Berwick Rangers F.C. players
Hibernian F.C. players
Cowdenbeath F.C. players
Arbroath F.C. players
Alloa Athletic F.C. players
Hamilton Academical F.C. players
F.C. Edinburgh players
Scottish Professional Football League players
Association football defenders
Scotland youth international footballers